Eric Bieniemy Jr. (born August 15, 1969) is an American football coach and former running back who is the assistant head coach and offensive coordinator (OC) for the Washington Commanders of the National Football League (NFL). He played college football for the Colorado Buffaloes and is their all-time leader in rushing yards (3,940) and touchdowns (42). He was named a unanimous All-American and finished third in Heisman Trophy voting during their national championship season in 1990.

Bieniemy was selected by the San Diego Chargers in the second round of the 1991 NFL Draft, later playing for the Cincinnati Bengals and Philadelphia Eagles primarily as a special teamer before returning to Colorado in the early 2000s to finish his degree. Following that, he was hired as the school's running backs coach and later coached for the UCLA Bruins and Minnesota Vikings.

Bieniemy was Colorado's OC for two seasons prior to joining the Kansas City Chiefs as running backs coach in 2013. He was promoted to OC under head coach Andy Reid in 2018, winning Super Bowl LIV and Super Bowl LVII with the Chiefs before joining the Commanders as their assistant head coach and OC in 2023.

Early years
Bieniemy (pronounced ) was born in New Orleans, Louisiana, on August 15, 1969. He later moved with his family to Hollywood, California, in 1979 before settling in West Covina, California, the following year. He later attended Bishop Amat Memorial High School in La Puente, California, lettering in football and track and field. Bieniemy earned second-team All-America football honors as a senior in 1986 after rushing for 2,002 yards and 30 touchdowns.

College
Bieniemy enrolled at the University of Colorado Boulder in 1987, choosing them over the University of Southern California explaining: "I had been used to living in big city; I had never been in a small city. It was pretty, it was the first time in snow, it was just something different. I wanted to be a part of it." He was an immediate starter for the Colorado Buffaloes as a freshman and was named to the 1988 All-Big Eight Conference football team as a sophomore after rushing 219 times for 1,243 yards and 10 touchdowns.

He played in the Fifth Down Game against Missouri as a senior in 1990, in which two consecutive rushes by him were counted as second down due to an officiating error. By the end of the 1990 season, he was named the Big Eight Conference's Offensive Player of the Year while finishing third in Heisman Trophy voting after rushing for 1,628 with 17 touchdowns en route to a national championship. Bieniemy is Colorado's all-time leader in rushing (3,940 yards), rushing touchdowns (42), and all-purpose yards (4,351). He was inducted into the school's Athletic Hall of Fame in 2010.

Professional career
Bieniemy was selected by the San Diego Chargers in the second round (39th overall) of the 1991 NFL Draft. In 1994, he appeared in Super Bowl XXIX and recorded a 33-yard reception, the longest of the game for the team. He signed with the Cincinnati Bengals in 1995. His final season came with the Philadelphia Eagles in 1999. Bieniemy finished his NFL playing career 1,589 yards rushing, 1,223 yards receiving, 276 return yards, 1,621 yards on kickoff returns, and 12 touchdowns (11 rushing and one kickoff).

Coaching career

Early college jobs
Bieniemy was an assistant coach at Denver's Thomas Jefferson High School in 2000. He re-enrolled at Colorado in 2001 to finish his degree in sociology and was the running backs coach for the Buffaloes from 2001 to 2002 and was UCLA running back coach from 2003 to 2005, as well as the team's recruiting coordinator in 2005.

Minnesota Vikings
Following UCLA's 2005 Sun Bowl victory, Bieniemy accepted a position as running backs coach for the Minnesota Vikings in the NFL. During his time with the Vikings, Adrian Peterson, led the NFC in rushing with 1,341 yards in 2007 and also in 2008 with 1,760 yards, which was also top in the NFL. Bieniemy was given the title of assistant head coach in 2010.

Return to Colorado
On December 2, 2010, Bieniemy returned to Colorado as offensive coordinator under head coach Jon Embree. Bieniemy was offered the head coach position in 2020 at Colorado but declined.

Kansas City Chiefs
In 2013, Kansas City Chiefs head coach Andy Reid hired Bieniemy to be the running backs coach.In 2018, Reid promoted Bieniemy to offensive coordinator to succeed Matt Nagy who had been hired as the head coach of the Chicago Bears. In Bieniemy's first season as the Chiefs offensive coordinator, the Chiefs were first in the NFL in yards per game and points scored. The Chiefs scored the third-most points in a season in NFL history with 565. Additionally, Chiefs quarterback Patrick Mahomes became the second quarterback in NFL history, along with Peyton Manning, to throw for 5,000 yards and 50 touchdowns in a season. The Chiefs reached the 2018 AFC Championship Game where they lost to the New England Patriots. In 2019, Bieniemy won his first Super Bowl when the Chiefs defeated the San Francisco 49ers 31–20 in Super Bowl LIV. In 2022, Bieniemy won his second Super Bowl with the Chiefs after defeating the Philadelphia Eagles 38-35 in Super Bowl LVII.

Washington Commanders 
In 2023, Bieniemy signed a two-year contract with the Washington Commanders to be their assistant head coach and offensive coordinator. He has full playcalling duties, something he shared under Chiefs head coach Andy Reid.

Personal life
Bieniemy and his wife, Mia, have two sons, Eric III and Elijah. A nephew, Jamal, played basketball at the University of Oklahoma and University of Texas El Paso. He also is a member of Omega Psi Phi.

Legal issues
Bieniemy was arrested along with Colorado teammate Kanavis McGhee following a bar fight in February 1988. McGhee said the dispute arose after Bieniemy alleged that he had been called a "nigger" by a bar patron. He pleaded no contest to disorderly conduct and was sentenced to community service. Bieniemy also received discipline from head coach Bill McCartney.

In 1989, Bieniemy was ticketed in Westminster, Colorado for driving a defective vehicle, and in Aurora, Colorado for speeding. In October 1990, his license was suspended for a year after another traffic violation. On March 21, 1991, Bieniemy was caught speeding and driving with suspended license on Interstate 70 near Rifle, Colorado, going 92 mph in a 65 mph zone. On April 17, 1991, Bieniemy failed to appear in court on charges relating to the March 21 incident. A bench warrant was issued in Colorado for his arrest on April 23, 1991, two days after Bieniemy was drafted in the NFL.

On July 4, 1990, Bieniemy pleaded no contest to interfering with a firefighter who had been performing his duties to extinguish a fire in Bieniemy's mother's garage. Bieniemy received an eight-month suspended sentence and was suspended for one game. Bieniemy was instructed to do 40 hours of community service and attend an eight-hour firefighting training session. An assistant city attorney said that Bieniemy failed to attend the firefighting training session as stipulated in the plea agreement, but Bieniemy asserted the session was optional.

On September 27, 1993, Bieniemy was arrested in Boulder, Colorado, for allegedly harassing a female parking attendant. According to the police report, while with his friends, Bieniemy put his hand on the attendant's neck, startling her. She told police ," that Bieniemy and his friends took off their pants and began urinating nearby. Bieniemy was also named in an outstanding warrant on a charge of driving with a suspended license. As a result of this incident, Bieniemy was banned from the University of Colorado Boulder campus for one year. In April 2001, Bieniemy was arrested for driving under the influence and was docked a month's pay.

References

External links
 Washington Commanders bio
 Colorado Buffaloes bio
 UCLA Bruins bio

1969 births
20th-century African-American sportspeople
21st-century African-American sportspeople
African-American coaches of American football
African-American players of American football
All-American college football players
American football running backs
Cincinnati Bengals players
Coaches of American football from California
Colorado Buffaloes football coaches
Colorado Buffaloes football players
Kansas City Chiefs coaches
Living people
Minnesota Vikings coaches
National Football League offensive coordinators
People from La Puente, California
Philadelphia Eagles players
Players of American football from Los Angeles
Players of American football from New Orleans
San Diego Chargers players
UCLA Bruins football coaches
Washington Commanders coaches